The Private Hospitals Association (PHA) is a private, voluntary, non-profit organization that was established in 1984, representing the private hospitals in Jordan. Its membership is open to all private hospitals in Jordan.
PHA applies quality standards and general guidelines on its members in order to maintain and perhaps raise the Jordanian health care reputation. Recently, the association applied the national accreditation program to all medical sectors that belong to the association. And now, Jordan’s high tech hospitals, such as the Specialty Hospital, the Arab Medical Centre, Al Khalidi Medical Center and many others, with their high class healthcare at costs significantly less than those of Europe and the US, gained the PHA a high reputation for its work and progress for reaching its aim.

Aim
PHA main aim is for the hospitals that are members of its association become globally competitive with the medical service that they offer. With that aim in mind, PHA attempt to make the Jordanian hospitals to become amongst the medical service leaders on a global level.

History
The Private Hospitals Association was founded in 1984, the idea of the association was founded when the private hospitals in Jordan needed to have a united front and sort their demands when approaching the government. The association did not have an immediate impact, since it started weak and with only 8 members. Recently, the PHA became an admirable association with 48 members, and their achievements were widely recognized and proved influential on the public, mainly, under the guidance of their chairman Dr. Fawzi Al-Hammouri.

USAID-funded SABEQ Program
USAID-funded Sustainable Achievement of Business Expansion and Quality program (SABEQ) is a five year broad economic development initiative implemented by BearingPoint Inc. and a team of international and Jordanian partner firms. By both supporting improvements in the business environment and offering assistance to increase productivity in Jordanian medical services' businesses, it supports the primary objective of building up the private medical sector as a high profile powerful engine of economic growth.

USAID/SABEQ program signed Memoranda of Understanding with the PHA in October 2007. Ever since the program started, the PHA have received support in various forms, most of the support was directed towards technical assistance. The association started participating in international medical travel conferences more extensively, and that is to pursue the goals of the program.

The goal of the funding is to enhance the quality of services provided, increase their market access internationally, increase the number of incoming patients, help develop medical professionals, and train PHA members and staff to the standards compliant with international certifications, such as JCI's standards.

List of Members

Board members

 The Specialty Hospital
 Al-Israa Hospital
 Marka Islamic Hospital
 Arab Medical Center
 Palestine Hospital
 Al-Hamaideh Hospital
 Qaser Shabeeb Hospital

Other Members

 King Hussein Cancer Center
 Jordan Hospital (Jordan)
 Islamic Hospital
 Al Khalidi Medical Center
 Ibn Al-Haytham Hospital
 Eye Hospital
 Amman Surgical Hospital
 Istiklal Hospital
 Shemesani Hospital
 Luzmilla Hospital
 Al-Amal Hospital
 Hiba Hospital
 Al-Hayat Hospital
 The Specialty Center for Fertility & Genetics
 Jerusalem Hospital
 Philadelphia Hospital
 Al-Rasheed Hospital
 Al-Istishari Hospital
 Al-Ahli Hospital
 Al-Hanan General Hospital
 Aqleh Hospital
 Al-Bayader Hospital
 Italian Hospital,  Amman
 Abdulhadi Eye Hospital
 Jabal Amman Hospital
 International Hospital
 Al-Aqsa Hospital
 Italian Hospital,  Karak
 Al-Hikma Modern Hospital
 Al-Razi New Hospital
 Jabal Al-Zaitoon Hospital
 Najjah Hospital
 Irbid Specialty Hospital
 Qawasemi Hospital
 ibn Al-Nafis Hospital
 Irbid Islamic Hospital
 Society Rosary Sisters Hospital
 Al-Safa`a Specialty Hospital
 Islamic Hospital
 Aqaba Modern Hospital
 Al-Mahabba Hospital

References

Hospitals in Jordan